The 2021 Formula 4 UAE Championship was the fifth season of the Formula 4 UAE Championship, a motor racing series for the United Arab Emirates regulated according to FIA Formula 4 regulations, and organised and promoted by the Emirates Motorsport Organization (EMSO) – formerly known as Automobile & Touring Club of the UAE (ATCUAE) and AUH Motorsports. This was the last season that used Tatuus F4-T014 chassis.

The season commenced on 13 January at Dubai Autodrome and concluded on 13 February at the same venue.

Teams and drivers

Race calendar 

The schedule announced on 7 September 2020 consisted of 20 races over 5 rounds. All rounds will be held in the United Arab Emirates. The final round scheduled to take place on 4–6 March was anticipated to 28–30 January.

Championship standings 

Points were awarded to the top 10 classified finishers in each race.

Drivers' Championship

Teams' Championship 
Ahead of each event, the teams nominate two drivers that accumulate teams' points.

Notes

References

External links 

 F4 UAE Homepage

Formula 4 UAE Championship seasons
UAE
UAE
F4 UAE